Roma! is an American glam rock group.

Roma!'s debut album The Wild Party (2011) was produced by David Barratt.

References

American glam rock musical groups